Maharani Laxmi Bai Medical College or MLBMC or MLB Medical College is a state-run medical college located in Jhansi, Uttar Pradesh, India, and one of the largest government-run hospitals in the Bundelkhand region of Uttar Pradesh. The college is affiliated to Bundelkhand University. It is named after Maharani Lakshmi Bai of Jhansi. It provides medical care to people of Bundelkhand region. The college building spread over a walled area of 380 acres and this is one of the biggest medical college campus in the country.

Courses
The following courses are taught:

 Bachelor of Medicine Bachelor of Surgery, MBBS
 Medicinae Doctor, MD {in various courses}
 Master of Surgery, MS (in various courses)

Admission
For 150 seats in MBBS course NEET UG entrance exam held every year, in which college offer 15% seats via All India Quota and 85% seats via State Quota

For postgraduate courses NEET PG is the qualifying exam to secure a seat.

Entry to this institute is highly competitive, with admission offered to less than top 1% of applicants. The medical college entrance examination for MLBMC is through NEET exam in India.

Facilities 
 Library -  The college library is situated on the first floor in the teaching block, having a capacity of 150 readers. There are 10,147 books and 5,600 back volumes of journals. The library is receiving about 85 Indian/ foreign journals currently. Library has microfilm reader/reprography equipment. Recently has established a Cyber Unit with Internet linkage. The library is open for students from 11:00 am to 7:00 pm on working days. Graduate students can study books in the library only. Damaging books or tearing them is a serious act of indiscipline and shall be punished.
 Hostel - The college has following hostels for its undergraduate and postgraduate students.  C V Raman Hostel - Under Graduate boys’ hostel  Dhanwantari Hostel - Under Graduate boys’ hostel  Senior Boys Hostel - Post Graduate boys hostel  Girls Hostel - Under Graduate girl's hostel  P.G. Girls Hostel - Post Graduate girls hostel
 Sports Ground
Auditorium - Auditorium is provided to students for conducting different Cultural events, Seminars etc.

Upgradation 
The Government of India has decided to upgrade the institute on lines of All India Institute of Medical Sciences as part of phase-3 of Pradhan Mantri Swasthya Suraksha Yojana (PMSSY) whereby the Central Government will bear 80% of the cost of up gradation, and 20% cost will be borne by State Government.

Super Speciality Block
Super speciality block as a part of upgradation will pave the pathway for various super-speciality courses in this college.

E-Hospital
The Maharani Laxmibai Medical College has started the exercise of E-Hospital on the lines of SGPGI Lucknow. After this the patients will get all the facilities online, which will save patients time. The doctor will also be able to see the patient's full record on the computer. After that the entire work related to treatment will start online. Besides the registration, the inquiry report will also be available online. Details of patients associated with other departments, including wards, ICU, operation theatre, will be available online. On the basis of UID, in cases of complex diseases, doctors will be able to advise them by looking at the online report. If operation is required, then patients will get an automatic generated number online.

References

External links
 College Website 
 MLBMC

Medical colleges in Uttar Pradesh
Education in Jhansi
Educational institutions established in 1968
1968 establishments in Uttar Pradesh
Bundelkhand University